In mathematics and physics, super Minkowski space or Minkowski superspace is a supersymmetric extension of Minkowski space, sometimes used as the base manifold (or rather, supermanifold) for superfields. It is acted on by the  super Poincaré algebra.

Construction

Abstract construction 
Abstractly, super Minkowski space is the space of (right) cosets within the Super Poincaré group of Lorentz group, that is,
.

This is analogous to the way ordinary Minkowski spacetime can be identified with the (right) cosets within the Poincaré group of the Lorentz group, that is, 
.

The coset space is naturally affine, and the nilpotent, anti-commuting behavior of the fermionic directions arises naturally from the Clifford algebra associated with the Lorentz group.

Direct sum construction 

Super Minkowski space can be concretely realized as the direct sum of Minkowski space, which has coordinates , with 'spin space'. The dimension of 'spin space' depends on the number  of supercharges in the associated super Poincaré algebra to the super Minkowski space under consideration. In total this forms 4 spin coordinates.

The notation for  super Minkowski space is then .

There are theories which admit  supercharges. Such cases have extended supersymmetry.

Definition

The underlying supermanifold of super Minkowski space is isomorphic to a super vector space given by the direct sum  of ordinary Minkowski spacetime in d dimensions (often taken to be 4) and a number  of real spinor representations of the Lorentz algebra. (When  this is slightly ambiguous because there are 2 different real spin representations, so one needs to replace  by a pair of integers , though some authors use a different convention and take  copies of both spin representations.)

However this construction is misleading for two reasons: first, super Minkowski space is really an affine space over a group rather than a group, or in other words it has no distinguished "origin", and second, the underlying supergroup of translations is not a super vector space but a nilpotent supergroup of nilpotent length 2. 

This supergroup has the following Lie superalgebra.

Then there is an invariant, symmetric bilinear map . This bilinear map is unique up to isomorphism. 

The dimensions of the irreducible real spinor representation(s) for various dimensions d of spacetime are given a table below.
The table also displays the type of  reality structure for the spinor representation, and the type of  invariant bilinear form on the spinor representation.

The table repeats whenever the dimension increases by 8, except that the dimensions of the spin representations are multiplied by 16.

Notation

In the physics literature, a super Minkowski spacetime is often specified by giving the dimension  of the even, bosonic part (dimension of the spacetime), and the number of times  that each irreducible spinor representation occurs in the odd, fermionic part. This  is the number of supercharges in the associated super Poincaré algebra to the super Minkowski space.

In mathematics, Minkowski spacetime is sometimes specified in the form Mm|n or  where m is the dimension of the even part and n the dimension of the odd part. This is notation used for -graded vector spaces. The notation can be extended to include the signature of the underlying spacetime, often this is  if .

The relation is as follows: the integer  in the physics notation is the integer  in the mathematics notation, while the integer  in the mathematics notation is  times the integer  in the physics notation, where  is the dimension of (either of) the irreducible real spinor representation(s). A general expression is then 
.

When , there are two different irreducible real spinor representations, and authors use various different conventions.

In physics the letter P  is used for a basis of the even bosonic part of the Lie superalgebra, and the letter Q is often used for a basis of the complexification of the odd fermionic part, so in particular the structure constants of the Lie superalgebra may be complex rather than real. Often the basis elements Q come in complex conjugate pairs, so the real subspace can be recovered as the fixed points of complex conjugation.

Signature (p,q) 

The real dimension associated to the factor  or  can be found for generalized Minkowski space with dimension  and arbitrary signature . The earlier subtlety when  instead becomes a subtlety when . For the rest of this section, the signature refers to the difference .

The dimension depends on the reality structure on the spin representation. This is dependent on the signature  modulo 8, given by the table 

We define the spin representation  to be the representation constructed using the exterior algebra of some vector space, as described here. When the signature is even, there is the extra subtlety that if the signature is a multiple of 4 then these half-spin representations are inequivalent, otherwise they are equivalent.

Then if the signature is odd,  counts the number of copies of the spin representation . If the signature is even and not a multiple of 4,  counts the number of copies of the half-spin representation. If the signature is a multiple of 4, then  counts the number of copies of each half-spin representation.

Then, if the reality structure is real, then the complex dimension becomes the real dimension. On the other hand if the reality structure is quaternionic or complex (hermitian), the real dimension is double the complex dimension.

This allows the calculation of the dimension of superspace with underlying spacetime  with  supercharges, or  supercharges when the signature is a multiple of 4.

Restrictions on dimensions and supercharges

Higher-spin theory 

More straightforwardly there is an upper bound on the dimension of the spin space  where  is the dimension of the spin representation if the signature is odd, and the dimension of the half-spin representation if the signature is even.

This bound arises as any theory with more than  supercharges automatically has fields with (absolute value of) spin greater than 2. More mathematically, any representation of the superalgebra contains fields with spin greater than 2. Theories that consider such fields are known as  higher-spin theories. On Minkowski space, there are no-go theorems which prohibit such theories from being interesting.

For generalized Minkowski spaces of arbitrary signature, the upper dimension depends sensitively on the signature, as detailed in an earlier section.

Supergravity 

A large number of supercharges  also implies local supersymmetry. If supersymmetries are gauge symmetries of the theory, then since the supercharges can be used to generate translations, this implies infinitesimal translations are gauge symmetries of the theory. But these generate local diffeomorphisms, which is a signature of gravitational theories. So any theory with local supersymmetry is necessarily a supergravity theory.

The limit placed on massless representations is the highest spin field must have spin , which places a limit of  supercharges for theories without supergravity.

Supersymmetric Yang-Mills theories 

These are theories consisting of a gauge superfield partnered with a spinor superfield. This requires a matching of degrees of freedom. This places restrictions on super Minkowski spaces which can support a supersymmetric Yang-Mills theory.

See also 
 Superspace
 Super vector space
 Super-Poincaré algebra

References

 

Supersymmetry